Chief Raymond Anthony Aleogho Dokpesi (born 25 October 1951) in Ibadan is a Nigerian media entrepreneur. His parents are from Agenebode, Edo state in a family including six sisters siblings.  He entered the Nigerian mass media industry with his company DAAR Communications and set-up the Nigerian TV network Africa Independent Television (AIT) He was the organising committee chairman of the People's Democratic Party national conference in 2015. As of March 2020, he is still undergoing a trial on corruption charges. In May 2020, Dokpesi became a COVID-19 survivor.

Education
Dokpesi started his early schooling with Loyola College Ibadan. After which he joined the Immaculate Conception College (ICC) Benin city where he was the pioneer member of Ozolua Play house, a dance/drama group. He did his undergraduate studies in the University of Benin Edo State and completed his studies in University of Gdansk, Poland where he earned his Doctorate degree in Marine Engineering. His studies, from secondary school to university level was sponsored by Alhaji Bamanga Tukur

In the early 1990s, as a result of the historic National Broadcasting Commission decree, according to Muyiwa Oyinlola (2004) Nigerian media was dominated by the government only. Information was only made possible from government owned broadcasting firms. However, the Head of State then General Ibrahim Babangida, issued another decree which allowed private broadcasting in Nigeria. After this decree came the first private television network in Nigeria, Africa Independent Television (AIT). AIT was pioneered by Dokpesi, and was also Africa's first satellite Television station. Today Dokpesi is regarded as the media guru of Nigeria. Some also refer to him as the Ted Turner of Nigeria. Dokpesi not only pioneered the first satellite TV but also the first privately owned radio station in Nigeria. According to the journalist Kolapo (2006), Raymond claims that AIT set the standard for salary structure in the media industry in which Nigerian Television Authority imitated.

Career 
Dr. Raymond Dokpesi started as the personal assistant to Alhaji Bamaga Tukur one of the general manager of the Nigerian Ports Authority. Dokpesi also served as a civil servant in the Federal Ministry of Transport under Alhaji Umaru Dikko and General Garba Wushishi. The association of Raymond Dokpesi with the likes of the Tukurs and the late Abiola, resulted in the birth of African Ocean Lines (AOL).

Africa Ocean Lines 
Dokpesi (2006) summarises African Ocean Lines; one of High Chief, Dr. Raymond Dokpesi first businesses was the first indigenous Shipping Line in Africa. It was established in the 1980s. Although the business did not last long, it contributed a great deal to the Nigerian shipping Industry as it helped formulate the Nigerian shipping act Decree 1986 which stated the sharing formula 40:20:20 for cargo between developed and developing countries.

Daar Communications 

However, as High Chief, Dr. Raymond Dokpesi practised in his field of study; he never forgot his first love, showbiz and entertainment. This can be traced back to his early days in secondary school when he was the pioneer member of Ozolua Playhouse, dancedrama group. He decided to put his dream to reality when he conceived the idea of starting a radio station during the Ibarahim Babaginda regime when the atmosphere was conducive enough due to the deregulation of broadcasting in Nigeria. In 1994 he launched the first Nigerian private FM radio station RayPower. Two years later, he launched Africa Independent Television. Thus, according to Oyinlola (2005) he became the pacesetter in the world of Nigeria media for the likes of Galaxy TV, Silverbird TV, MBI television, Rhythm FM and a host of others.

Expansion in the USA and Europe 
Africa Independent Television has gained much coverage. On 20 September 2003, Africa Independent Television launched its signals in the United States. Presently, AIT is received in America, Mexico, the Caribbean, and Europe-wide on the Hotbird satellite as well as countries within Africa.

Accomplishments and achievements 
Dokpesi's accomplishments include:
 Established the first indigenous shipping line in Nigeria.
 Established the first privately owned radio station Raypower FM in Nigeria.
 Pioneered Nigeria's First global TV which was Africa's first ever Satellite TV station.
 Established the first TV station to run 24-hour broadcasting in Nigeria.
 Launched the African Independent signals in the United States.
 Chairman of the Independent Broadcasting Association of Nigeria.
 Helped in the formulation of the Nigerian Shipping Policy Act(decree) of 1986.

Politics 
Dokpesi also has his hands in politics. One of his first political assignments was as a political campaign manager for the Alhaji Bamanga Tukur, which saw Tukur into the then Gongola state government house. He also assumed the same role during Alharji Adamu Ciroma presidential campaign, and Alharji Bamanga Tukur's presidential campaign in 1993.Likewise during Peter Odili's presidential campaign. Dokpesi was one of the leaders of the South-South People Assembly (SSPA) an organisation that seeks to promote south-south people of Nigeria. In 2017, Dokpesi contested for the PDP National Chairmanship position but lost to Uche Secondus.

Awards and honours 
Dokpesi has received awards to his credit on behalf of DAAR Communications Plc, and has been conferred with titles from his hometown in appreciation of his tremendous efforts towards Nigeria. His hometown conferred two 
chieftaincy titles upon him, both of which are only bestowed on worthy sons. He is the Oghieumua and Ezomo of Weppa Wanno, Edo State, as well as the Araba of Osoroland, Okpe. According to Ojewale (2004), as mentioned during the Dr. Kwame Nkrumah Leadership Award ceremony in Accra, and the Foundation for Excellence in Business Practice Geneva Switzerland, Dokpesi was praised for Daar communications rise to the top in Africa and contributions of Radio and Television station that has placed Nigeria on the world map.

Philanthropy 
Raymond Dokpesi has built schools for community and also offered scholarships to prospective students into tertiary institutions.

Criticism and controversy 
On 4 October 2010, Dokpesi was arrested for his alleged role a Abuja car bombing. He was released after spending nine hours in detention and afterwards sued the country's secret police for alleged wrongful imprisonment.

On 11 November 2015 Dokpesi, on behalf of the PDP party, made a public apology due to the mismanagement of Nigeria under the PDP governments.

"Make no mistake, the PDP is aware that there were errors made along the way. We admit that at certain times in our past, mistakes have been made; we did not meet the expectations of Nigerians. We tender an apology. But the past is exactly what it is. We call on all party faithful, supporters and sympathisers to partner us going forward."

He also criticised the PDP for fielding Jonathan Goodluck as the PDP's presidential candidate in the March 2015 elections.

Money-laundering and corruption criminal charges against Raymond Dokpesi
On 9 December 2015,  Dokpesi and his company, Daar Holding and Investment Limited, were charged in the Federal High Court, Abuja in a USD2.1bn accused money laundering scam. The FG claimed the money was budgeted for weapons procurement for the Nigerian military to fight against the Boko Haram militants, but was confirmed diverted by Sambo Dasuki, the then National Security Advisor, to Dokpesi's Daar Holding and Investment Limited for the Nigerian presidential election of 2015 in favour of President Goodluck Jonathan.

The court charges marked "FHC/ABJ/CR/380/2015" and filed by the Economic and Financial Crimes Commission (EFCC) indicated that they are accused of violating the Money Laundering Act, the EFCC Act and the Public Procurement Act. The presiding judge, Justice Gabriel Kolawole, granted bail to Mr. Dokpesi and adjourned the trial until 17 February 2016.

On March 22, 2019, was returned to jail after being  arrested at the Nnamdi Azikiwe Airport in Abuja, where he arrived after returning from medical treatment in Dubai, but was soon released. In November 2019, he was granted the right to leave Nigeria for medical reasons despite the ongoing trial proceedings. 

On Thursday, 1st of April, 2021, Raymond Dokpesi was acquitted of all money laundering charges by the Federal Appeal Court of Nigeria.

Health
In 2020, Dokpesi and members of his family were hospitalized at the University of Abuja Teaching Hospital after they were diagnosed with COVID-19. Dokpesi and two of his grandchildren were discharged on May 14, 2020 after they all tested negative for remains of COVID-19. At the time of this discharge, however, Dokpesi's son Raymond Jr. and other family members were still receiving treatment.

References 

1951 births
Living people
Nigerian television company founders
Nigerian radio company founders
People from Ibadan
University of Gdańsk alumni
University of Benin (Nigeria) alumni
Loyola College, Ibadan alumni